No Cross No Crown is the tenth studio album by American heavy metal band Corrosion of Conformity, released on January 12, 2018 by Nuclear Blast.

It is the first album to feature the "classic" lineup of Woody Weatherman, Mike Dean, Reed Mullin and Pepper Keenan since America's Volume Dealer (2000). It is also the last album to feature Mullin, who died in early 2020.

Accolades

Track listing
All music composed by Corrosion of Conformity, all lyrics by Pepper Keenan except "A Quest to Believe (A Call to the Void)" by Pepper Keenan/Mike Dean. "Son and Daughter" music and lyrics by Brian May.

Personnel
Corrosion of Conformity
Pepper Keenan – lead vocals, rhythm guitar
Woody Weatherman – lead guitar, backing vocals
Mike Dean – bass, backing vocals
Reed Mullin – drums, backing vocals
Production
John Custer – production

Charts

References

2018 albums
Corrosion of Conformity albums
Nuclear Blast albums